The  was a Japanese fleet oiler, serving during the Second World War.

Construction
In 1941, the IJN wanted fleet oilers for their carrier task force, because they had only the eight old, low-speed tankers. The IJN prepared sixteen Kawasaki-type tankers to solve this. However, they did not have facilities for gasoline. The IJN intended to build four Kazahayas (Ship # 304-307). However, all naval arsenals were crowded at the outbreak of war. The IJN bought one of the same type of merchant tanker made by Harima with the Kazahaya naval budget.

Service
She succeeded in one transportation duty, and was sunk by submarines.

Ships in class

Bibliography
, History of Pacific War Vol.62 "Ships of The Imperial Japanese Forces, Gakken (Japan), January 2008, 
Ships of the World special issue Vol.47, Auxiliary Vessels of the Imperial Japanese Navy, (Japan), March 1997

World War II naval ships of Japan
Auxiliary ships of the Imperial Japanese Navy
World War II tankers
1943 ships
Oilers
Ships sunk by American submarines